The River Avon (locally “Aan” /ɑːn/) is a river in the Strathspey area of the Scottish Highlands, and a tributary of the River Spey. It drains the north-eastern area of the Cairngorm Mountains and is largely contained within the Cairngorms National Park

The source of the River Avon is conventionally said to be Loch Avon situated between Cairn Gorm and Ben Macdui (Gaelic: Beinn MacDhuibh). Loch Avon itself collects headwaters from a number of burns on these two mountains. From Loch Avon, the river then continues east down Glen Avon to the north of Ben Avon, for 10 miles before turning north towards the village of Tomintoul and Strath Avon.

There is a River Avon Fishing Association that promotes tourism in nearby towns and fishing along the river.

Tributaries 
Over the first few miles flowing east through the Forest of Glenavon the Avon gathers to itself numerous small burns, the most notable of which are the Burn of Loin and the Builg Burn originating at Loch Builg. The latter flows down Glen Builg to enter the Avon on its right bank just downstream of the Linn of Avon.

A mile to the southwest of Tomintoul, the Water of Ailnack enters from the confines of a precipitous gorge - the higher reaches of this watercourse are known as the Water of Caiplich. Downstream of Tomintoul, the Conglass Water originating at the Lecht, enters from the east and the Burn of Lochy enters from Glen Lochy to the west. Above Bridge of Brown, the Lochy is fed in turn by the Burn of Brown. The lowermost tributary of the Avon is the River Livet which enters from Glenlivet on the right bank at Drumin just as the Avon leaves the national park.

Etymology 
In common with the various other examples of Avon, the river takes its name from the Gaelic abhainn meaning 'river' or 'stream'. The word, in common with the Welsh afon, is thought to originate from an early Indo-European root ab or aub.

References 

Avon, Strathspey
1Avon